The 1991 British Columbia general election was the 35th provincial election in the Province of British Columbia, Canada. It was held to elect members of the Legislative Assembly of British Columbia. The election was called on September 19, 1991, and held on October 17, 1991. The incumbent Social Credit Party of British Columbia, which had been beset by scandals during Bill Vander Zalm's only term as premier, was defeated by the New Democratic Party of Mike Harcourt. Liberal Party leader Gordon Wilson surprised observers by leading his party to winning one-third of the votes cast, and forming the official opposition in the legislature. The new legislature met for the first time on March 17, 1992.

The election was held at the same time as a referendum on recall and initiative. It was also the first British Columbia general election with only single-member districts.

Background
Under Vander Zalm's leadership, Socred's control shifted from urban fiscal conservatives to social conservatives. Vander Zalm seemingly cruised to victory in the 1986 provincial election, held just a month after he was sworn in. In truth, however, a number of more moderate Socreds were not at home with the party's rightward turn on social issues, and began defecting to the Liberals.

This process was exacerbated by Vander Zalm's eccentricity, and the constant scandals that plagued his government. As well, Vander Zalm allowed his principal secretary, David Poole, to amass a substantial amount of power, despite being unelected.

Vander Zalm resigned in April 1991 amid a conflict of interest scandal surrounding the sale of a theme park that he owned.  Socred members elected the lesser-known Deputy Premier Rita Johnston, a close ally of Vander Zalm, to be their new leader, over Grace McCarthy, a longtime associate of former Premier Bill Bennett. Many viewed this as a mistake, as Johnston was close to the Vander Zalm legacy; even NDP leader Mike Harcourt admitted later that he preferred Johnston over McCarthy, as the latter would be a much tougher opponent in an election.

Campaign
Johnston had little time to make up ground in the polls or distance herself from the now-detested Vander Zalm. Additionally, the Socreds were still bitterly divided over the bruising leadership contest.

The Liberals, who had not been represented in the legislature since 1979, gained slightly in the polls due to great resentment against the ruling Socreds and skepticism towards the NDP. A turning point came when Wilson successfully took legal action to be included in the televised leaders' debate, which took place on 8 October. During the debate Johnston and Harcourt exchanged many bitter attacks, while Wilson, still not considered a serious contender, was able to successfully portray himself as an "outsider" who was above the partisan bickering of the other two parties. Liberal support surged dramatically as a result of Wilson's performance. One of the memorable moments of the debate came as Harcourt and Johnston argued loudly amongst each other, when Wilson pointed towards them and declared, "Here's a classic example of why nothing ever gets done in the province of British Columbia."

Results

The Socreds were swept from power in a massive NDP landslide. This was not due to the NDP winning a higher percentage of the vote as much as it was due to Socred support collapsing in favour of the BC Liberals, splitting the vote. The defeat was magnified by moderate Socred supporters voting Liberal, continuing a shift that dated to early in Vander Zalm's tenure. The combined effect was to decimate the Socred caucus, which was reduced from 47 members to only seven—only three over the minimum for official party status. Johnston herself lost her own seat in Surrey-Newton to NDP challenger Penny Priddy, and all but five members of her cabinet were defeated.

The Liberals returned to the legislature as the official opposition after a 12-year absence, replacing Social Credit as the main alternative to the NDP in the province.

Notes:
x - less than 0.005% of the popular vote.

* Party did not nominate candidates in the previous election.

Legacy
This was considered a political realignment due to the high turnover in MLAs and the effective end of the Socreds as a political force.  The party was completely shut out of the legislature in the 1996 election, never to return.  Meanwhile, the Liberals replaced them as the main non-socialist party in British Columbia. The NDP and Liberals have been the two main parties in the province since then.

However, neither Harcourt, Wilson, or Johnston would contest the subsequent 1996 election as leaders of the major parties, with Johnston and Harcourt having retired from politics by that campaign. Johnston, having lost her seat, resigned the leadership of the Socreds immediately in early 1992. Harcourt resigned as premier in 1996 due to a scandal among the MLAs in his caucus. Wilson proved unable to consolidate the party's leadership due to inexperience and he was eventually deposed in 1993, and he crossed to the NDP in 1997 after a brief spell as founder, leader and sole MLA of the Progressive Democratic Alliance. He served as an MLA and minister until his defeat in 2001. Wilson was also a candidate for the NDP's leadership in 2000, won by Ujjal Dosanjh.

See also
 List of British Columbia political parties

References

Further reading

External links
 Elections BC 1991 Election

1991
1991 elections in Canada
1991 in British Columbia
October 1991 events in Canada